Thumpamon may refer to:
 Thumpamon, a village in Pathanamthitta, India
 Thumpamon Vadakkumnatha Temple, a Shiva temple in Pathanamthitta, India
 Thumpamon Valiya Pally, an Orthodox church in Pathanamthitta, India